Juan J. de Pablo (born December 9, 1962) is a chemical engineer, Liew Family professor in the Pritzker School of Molecular Engineering at the University of Chicago and senior scientist at Argonne National Laboratory. In 2018, he was appointed Vice President for National Laboratories at the University of Chicago, a title which later expanded to include Science Strategy, Innovation and Global Initiatives in 2020. As of 2021, he is Executive Vice President for Science, Innovation, National Laboratories and Global Initiatives at the University of Chicago. He is known for his research on the thermophysical properties of soft materials. He is currently the co-director of the NIST supported Center for Hierarchical Materials Design (CHIMaD). and former director of the UW-Madison Materials Research Science and Engineering Center (MRSEC).
He was elected a member of the National Academy of Sciences in 2022.

Education
De Pablo earned a bachelor's degree in chemical engineering from Universidad Nacional Autónoma de México in 1985. After completing his Ph.D. in chemical engineering from the University of California, Berkeley in 1990 under the advisement of John Prausnitz. De Pablo conducted his postdoctoral research at the Swiss Federal Institute of Technology in Zurich, Switzerland.

Honors and awards 
He was elected a member of the National Academy of Engineering in 2016 for design of macromolecular products and processes via scientific computation. He is also a fellow of the American Academy of Arts and Sciences, the American Physical Society and an honorary member of the Mexican Academy of Sciences. He is recipient of the AIChE Charles M.A. Stine Award for outstanding contributions to the field of materials science and engineering, the DuPont Medal for excellence in nutrition and health science, and the American Physical Society 2018 Polymer Physics prize  He holds over 20 patents on multiple technologies.

References

External links
 Research Group Homepage
 Google Scholar Page

University of Chicago faculty
National Autonomous University of Mexico alumni
UC Berkeley College of Chemistry alumni
1962 births
Mexican chemical engineers
Living people
Members of the United States National Academy of Sciences
Recipients of the Presidential Early Career Award for Scientists and Engineers